Henry F. McElroy (1865–1939) was the first City Manager of Kansas City, Missouri. He held this position during the era of political boss Tom Pendergast.

Life and Work
Henry Francis McElroy was born on April 17, 1865 in Amboy, Illinois, less than 100 miles west of Chicago. He moved to Kansas City in 1896 to practice real estate. He was elected as one of two county judges of Jackson County, Missouri in 1922. The other county judge was Harry S Truman. The role of county judge was more like a county commissioner, but McElroy went by "Judge McElroy" even when he was City Manager. The role of City Manager was created when a new city charter was passed on November 3, 1925 and implemented the following April. The City Manager is hired by the Mayor and City Council, ideally as a non-partisan city administrator. While this new form of local government worked well in other cities and still exists in Kansas City, this city council was controlled by Political Boss Tom Pendergast. McElroy became known as the heavy-handed implementer of the policies of Pendergast's machine.

McElroy's business background and the "Country Bookkeeping" he developed as a store manager in Iowa impressed the Kansas City business community. They felt he was just what a City Manager should be. With this accounting method, he managed to cut in half the five million dollar deficit inherited from the previous administration, and announced a slight tax increase to cover the rest. However, he was not shy about exerting his power. One of his first acts was to take over the mayor's large office and relegating Mayor Albert I. Beach to an office behind that of the City Clerk. He also usurped the Mayor at various civil functions.

The federal investigation of Pendergast alleged that McElroy received graft payments from city service providers, contractors for the many building projects (Municipal Auditorium, City Hall, Jackson County Courthouse), and city real estate purchases. McElroy resigned as City Manager on April 13, 1939.

Personal
McElroy married Marie S. Orbison in 1906. They had two children, Mary and Henry Jr. Marie died in 1920 and McElroy never remarried. He refused to delegate his child-rearing responsibilities. "I reared those children myself," McElroy was quoted, "because it was my duty. I supervised their baths, their food, their dressing, and their comings and goings. It was my job and no one else could do it." On May 27, 1933, his daughter Mary was kidnapped with a ransom demand of $30,000. McElroy paid the ransom. During the Pendergast investigation, it was discovered that the ransom was reimbursed with city funds. $16,000 was recovered and returned to the city when the kidnappers were caught. The Pendergast investigation severely affected McElroy's health. On September 15, 1939 he died at his home of uremia and heart disease, the day after subpoenas were issued by a grand jury.

References

1865 births
1939 deaths
People from Amboy, Illinois
Businesspeople from Kansas City, Missouri
Politicians from Kansas City, Missouri
American city managers